The Church of Iulia Constantia was an Early Christian church in Morocco, located in the Roman colony of Iulia Constantia Zilil.

Characteristics
It had three naves, was equipped with a baptistery and had various appendices, close to the western door.

This paleochristian church is the only found in Atlantic Morocco, and harkens to the adoption of Christianity by romanised Berbers.

Note

See also
Iulia Constantia Zilil
Christian Berbers

Iulia Constantia Zilil
3rd-century churches